Boone's Lick State Historic Site is located in Missouri, United States, four miles east of Arrow Rock. The park was established in 1960 around one of the saltwater springs that was used in the early 19th century. It was named after Nathan and Daniel Morgan Boone, sons of Daniel Boone, who produced salt from the springs. The springs lent their name to the  Boone's Lick Country, the first major American settlement in Missouri, and the Boone's Lick Road, which traversed wilderness from St. Charles, Missouri to the boomtown of Franklin, Missouri, in the early 1800s.

See also
Nathan Boone Homestead State Historic Site

References

External links

Boone's Lick State Historic Site Missouri Department of Natural Resources 
Boone's Lick State Historic Site Map Missouri Department of Natural Resources 

Protected areas of Howard County, Missouri
Missouri State Historic Sites
Parks on the National Register of Historic Places in Missouri
Protected areas established in 1960
National Register of Historic Places in Howard County, Missouri